The 2004 European Figure Skating Championships was a senior international figure skating competition in the 2003–04 season. Medals were awarded in the disciplines of men's singles, ladies' singles, pair skating, and ice dancing. The event was held at the Budapest Sports Arena in Budapest, Hungary from February 2 to 8, 2004. The compulsory dance was the Austrian Waltz.

Qualifying
The competition was open to skaters from European ISU member nations who had reached the age of 15 before 1 July 2003. The corresponding competition for non-European skaters was the 2004 Four Continents Championships. National associations selected their entries based on their own criteria. Based on the results of the 2003 European Championships, each country was allowed between one and three entries per discipline.

Medals table

Competition notes
Due to the large number of participants, the men's qualifying group was split into groups A and B.

Results

Men

Ladies

Pairs

Ice dancing

References
 
 http://www.isuresults.com/events/EC10_MediaGuide.pdf

European Figure Skating Championships, 2004
European Figure Skating Championships, 2004
European Figure Skating Championships
International figure skating competitions hosted by Hungary
February 2004 sports events in Europe
International sports competitions in Budapest
2000s in Budapest